Oleg Fistican (born 1 February 1975 in Chișinău) is a Moldovan association football manager and former footballer, who played as defender.

In 1995–2000 Oleg Fistican has played 28 matches for Moldova national football team.

Honours
Zimbru Chișinău
Divizia Națională (5): 1994-1995, 1995-1996, 1997-1998, 1998-1999, 1999-2000
Runner-up: 1996-1997

Iskra-Stali
Divizia Națională
Third place: 2008–2009

References

External links

Profile on scoreshelf.com

1975 births
Living people
Moldovan footballers
Moldova international footballers
Association football defenders
Moldovan football managers
FC Zimbru Chișinău players
FC Zimbru Chișinău managers
FC Nistru Otaci players
FC Iskra-Stal players
Footballers from Chișinău
FC Saxan managers
Moldovan Super Liga managers